Greatest Hits - Live is an album by American singer-songwriter Don McLean, released in 1997.

Track listing

Disk: 1
"It's Just the Sun"
"Building My Body"
"Wonderful Baby"
"The Very Thought of You"
"Fool's Paradise"
"(You're So Square) Baby I Don't Care"
"You Have Lived"
"The Statue"
"Prime Time"
"American Pie"
"Left For Dead On The Road of Love"

Disk: 2
"Believers"
"Sea Man"
"It's a Beautiful Life"
"Chain Lightning"
"Crazy Eyes"
"La Love You"
"Dream Lover" (Bobby Darrin)
"Crying" (Roy Orbison)
"Vincent (Starry Starry Night)"

References

1997 live albums
Don McLean albums